Kranea is a village and a former community in the Preveza regional unit, Epirus, Greece. Since the 2011 local government reform it is part of the municipality Ziros, of which it is a municipal unit. The municipal unit has an area of 34.671 km2. Population 821 (2011).

References

Populated places in Preveza (regional unit)